Hiranandani Foundation School Thane is a school located in the Hiranandani Estate in the state of Maharashtra Thane, India. It was founded by Lakhumal Hiranand Hiranandani.

The school was founded in 1999. It is affiliated to Indian Certificate of Secondary Education (ICSE) board for 10th class and Indian School Certificate (ISC) for 12th class.

It is the sister school of Hiranandani Foundation School Powai (ICSE) in Hiranandani Gardens in Powai.

References

External links
The Powai and Thane schools' official website

Education in Thane
Schools in Thane district
1999 establishments in Maharashtra
Educational institutions established in 1999